Codeplay is a software development company based in Edinburgh, Scotland, founded in 2002

On 1 June 2022, it was announced that Intel would acquire the company.

References

Companies established in 2002
GPGPU
Software companies of the United Kingdom
2002 establishments in Scotland
Software companies established in 2002
Companies based in Edinburgh